Chinese Cemetery is a name given to many cemeteries around the world, generally in English speaking countries that have or had a significant ethnic or immigrant Chinese community.

Some notable cemeteries sometimes referred to as "Chinese Cemetery" are:

Canada
 Chinese Cemetery at Harling Point, in Oak Bay near Victoria, British Columbia

Pakistan
 Chinese cemetery, Gilgit, Gilgit-Baltistan

Philippines
 Manila Chinese Cemetery

United States
 Chinese Cemetery (Idaho), near Warren, Idaho
 Chinese Cemetery of Los Angeles, California
 Chung Wah Cemetery, Folsom, California